Kentucky Route 7 (KY 7) is a  state highway in the U.S. state of Kentucky.

Route description
Kentucky Route 7 begins at a junction with KY 15 at Jeff in Perry County. The route continues through the cities of Blackey in Letcher County, Wayland in Floyd County, Salyersville in Magoffin County, West Liberty in Morgan County, Sandy Hook in Elliott County, Grayson in Carter County, and South Shore in Greenup County, where the route terminates at East First Avenue a short distance north of US 23.

History

Beginning in the early 1960s, KY 7 was relocated near Bruin when a portion of the Little Sandy River was impounded to create Grayson Lake. To facilate a growing number of recreational enthusiasts, KY 7 was reconstructed on a new two-lane alignment from the northern edge of the Grayson Lake recreational area to Grayson between 1965 and 1975.

The route between Salyersville and Grayson was designated a part of the London-Ashland Highway in the mid-1990s. The designation extends along KY 7 and KY 30 between Interstate 64 in Grayson to Interstate 75 in London. As such, much of KY 7 between the southern boundary of Grayson Lake to Sandy Hook has been upgraded or relocated to a new alignment. The new alignments feature a  design speed, full  shoulders, and  travel lanes.

Major intersections

References

External links
KY 7 at Kentucky Roads

0007